Ganiwu Shaibu (born 25 May 1997) is a Ghanaian professional footballer who plays as a goalkeeper for Ghanaian Premier league side Liberty Professionals F.C.

Career 
Shaibu joined Dansoman-based club Liberty Professionals in January 2018. He made his debut on 25 March 2021 in a 3–1 loss to West African Football Academy. During the 2019 GFA Normalization Competition, he played seven games and kept four clean sheets. In the 2019–20 season, he became the main goalkeeper ahead of Kofi Baah and played all the ten league matches before cancelled due to the COVID-19 pandemic in Ghana. His standout performance came on 6 January 2020, when he put on an outstanding performance to be named man of the match in their away goalless draw against Berekum Chelsea. In the 73rd minute, he denied Kofi Owusu from the spot ensuring the match stayed goalless to deny the Blues from victory at the Golden City Park.

The following season, he lost his starting role to Baah who became the main goalkeeper and indirectly relegated him to serve as the second choice goalkeeper. He played his first match of that season on 29 November 2020 in a 1–1 draw against Techiman Eleven Wonders. During the match, he made saves to deny Salifu Ibrahim and Samuel Boakye from scoring.

References

External links 
 

Living people
1997 births
Ghanaian footballers
Association football forwards
Liberty Professionals F.C. players